Oxygen index may refer to:
 Oxygenation index in medicine
 In chemistry, the ratio of oxygen (atoms) over hydrogen in a particular substance, such as used in a Van Krevelen diagram

See also 
 Limiting oxygen index